David Garfield (September 27, 1956 in Chicago, Illinois) is an American keyboardist, songwriter, and record producer.

He has recorded with Smokey Robinson, Cher, Larry Carlton, Steve Lukather, Spinal Tap, George Benson, The Manhattan Transfer, Eros Ramazzotti, and The Rippingtons. He has performed with Freddie Hubbard, Boz Scaggs, Oleta Adams, Brenda Russell, Natalie Cole, and Michael Bolton. He is a founding member of Karizma and Los Lobotomys. He has been a songwriter, producer, bandleader, arranger, recording artist, record label owner (Creatchy Records), session and touring musician, musical director and composer of commissioned themes for global organizations.

Biography 
In addition to composing and performing music for Perfect Harmony, he has written several songs with Smokey Robinson, including "One Like You," which George Benson recorded on his 2009 album Songs & Stories. Garfield, who has been from time to time Benson's musical director since 1986, also arranged and produced Guitar Man. Garfield produced I Play The Piano, a DVD/Blu-Ray of Terry Trotter playing solo piano for AIX Media.

Garfield has been commissioned to write and produce theme songs and musical projects for several international organizations, including the composition and CD: "Pool of Friendship" for the European Aquatics Federation LEN (League of European Nations); the American Society of Cinematographers (ASC); and "Deep Within Each Man" (co-written with Phil Perry) for the Shorinji Kempo World Karate Foundation.

His first international release on Creatchy, 1997's Tribute To Jeff, was dedicated to drummer Jeff Porcaro. Garfield followed its Top Ten chart success with I Am The Cat… Man, and Giving Back. He re-released on Creatchy Records several collections from earlier in his career, including L.A. Keyboard Project, Recollections, and Seasons of Change.

Karizma's discography on Creatchy includes Dream Come True, Cuba, All The Way Live, (Forever in the) Arms of Love, Document, and Lost and Found. The other projects he has helmed for Creatchy include albums by guitarists Michael Landau and Michael O'Neill, saxophonists Brandon Fields and Larry Klimas and, most recently, former Toto bassist Mike Porcaro. Another Creatchy release, Los Lobotomys, is a collaboration with prominent members of the pop/rock band Toto, with whom Garfield has collaborated with many times throughout the years. Garfield also frequently does free-lance keyboard and production work for established and up and coming artists from across the U.S. and throughout the world.

In addition to his work with George Benson, Garfield continues ongoing musical relationships with numerous musicians, including Boz Scaggs and Natalie Cole. Over the years, he has recorded with Cher, Spinal Tap, The Rippingtons, Ratt, Larry Carlton, and Smokey Robinson; produced for Oleta Adams and Flora Purim; and has performed live with Michael Bolton, The Blues Brothers, Brenda Russell and Rick Braun, among others. Early in 2012, he was presented with the Hall of Fame Award from the Java Jazz Festival in Jakarta; Garfield has performed at the Indonesia event several times, most recently with saxophonist Gerald Albright and vocalist Alex Ligertwood. The same trio of musicians later performed at the Blue Note in Tokyo.

At the same time as he was performing his first gigs with Karizma in the mid-1970s, Garfield began working with jazz talents such as Willie Bobo, Freddie Hubbard, and Tom Scott. After establishing himself on the L.A. jazz scene, the keyboardist became a key part of the city's vast studio world during its heyday. These experiences ultimately led to composing opportunities for TV, film and commercials for such companies as NBC, Disney, Nippon Television, and RTL Germany. During the 1980s, Garfield arranged and produced many Japanese artists and went on to produce his own projects for release in Japan.

Reflecting on his diverse career, Garfield says, "It's creatively invigorating to have the opportunity to do so many interesting musical projects, to see so many amazing places throughout the world, and to work with some of the greatest musicians both in L.A. and overseas. I feel as though I am always learning from the artists and musicians I work with, not simply on a musical level, but also benefiting from their wealth of stories and life and career experiences. There are always unexpected thrills along the way, from opening with his band for Sergio Mendes or Jason Mraz to recording in a studio next to Paul McCartney or Alice in Chains and having the opportunity to meet and get to know them. I love being involved in so many different aspects of music and the feeling that I truly never know what's coming up next".

Discography

As leader
 1992: Seasons of Change
 1998: I Am The Cat... Man (David Garfield and The Cats)
 2003: Giving Back
 2018: Jazz Outside The Box
 2018: Jammin' Outside The Box
 2019: Vox Outside The Box
 2020: Holidays Outside The Box
 2021: Stretchin' Outside The Box

David Garfield and Friends
 1988: Music from Riding Bean
 1989: L.A. Keyboard Project
 1991: Recollections
 1997: Tribute to Jeff Porcaro
 2005: The State of Things

With Karizma
 1983: Dream Come True
 1986: Cuba
 1987: All The Way Live (Revisited)
 1989: (Forever In The) Arms of Love
 2000: Document
 2001: Lost and Found
 2012: Perfect Harmony [3CD set]
 2018: Live at 'Motion Blue' (Yokohama, Japan)
 2018: Live at 'The Baked Potato' with Jeff Porcaro

With Los Lobotomys (with Steve Lukather)
 1989: Los Lobotomys
 1994: Candyman
 2004: The Official Bootleg (Live)
 2018: Los Lobotomys 3.0

As sideman
Brandon Fields
 1989: Other Places

Steve Tavaglione
 1989: Blue Tav

Michael Landau
 1990: Tales from The Bulge

Pauline Wilson
 2001: Tribute

Potato Salad (with Lenny Castro and Larry Klimas)
 2004: Potato Salad

Mike Porcaro
 2011: Brotherly Love

Jeff Baxter/Teddy Castellucci/James Harrah/Buzzy Feiten
 1988: Guitar Workshop in L.A.

David Garfield with Alex Ligertwood
 1995: Metro 
 1997: Tribute to Jeff (Revisited) 
 2003: Giving Back
 2019: Alex Ligertwood Outside The Box

References

External links
 

American keyboardists
American male songwriters
Record producers from Illinois